In category theory, a branch of mathematics, for any object  in any category  where the product  exists, there exists the diagonal morphism 

satisfying 

 for 

where  is the canonical projection morphism to the -th component. The existence of this morphism is a consequence of the universal property that characterizes the product (up to isomorphism). The restriction to binary products here is for ease of notation; diagonal morphisms exist similarly for arbitrary products. The image of a diagonal morphism in the category of sets, as a subset of the Cartesian product, is a relation on the domain, namely equality.

For concrete categories, the diagonal morphism can be simply described by its action on elements  of the object . The reason for the name is that the image of such a diagonal morphism is diagonal (whenever it makes sense), for example the image of the diagonal morphism  on the real line is given by the line that is the graph of the equation . However, most notions of sequence spaces have convergence restrictions that the image of the diagonal map will fail to satisfy.

See also
 Diagonal functor
 Diagonal embedding

References

Morphisms